The Alaska Women's Hall of Fame (AWHF) recognizes women natives or residents of the U.S. state of Alaska for their significant achievements or statewide contributions. It was conceived by the board of directors of the Alaska Women's Network (AWN) in commemoration of the 50th anniversary of Alaska's statehood. The large inaugural class of fifty women were inducted weeks after that anniversary, on March 6, 2009, with subsequent classes inducted every year since. As of the class of 2015, 135 women and one organization, the Sisters of Providence, have been honored. The principal organizations involved with the AWHF are the Zonta Club of Anchorage, the YWCA, Alaska Women for Political Action, the Anchorage Women's Commission, the University of Alaska Anchorage, Alaska Women's Network and the ATHENA Society.

Inductees

References

External links
 

2009 establishments in Alaska
Annual events in Alaska
Awards established in 2009
Lists of American women
Women's Hall of Fame
State halls of fame in the United States
Women in Alaska
Women's halls of fame
Halls of fame in Alaska
History of women in Alaska